Priscansermarinus barnetti is an organism known from the Middle Cambrian Burgess Shale which was originally interpreted as a species of lepadomorph barnacle. Four specimens of P. barnetti are known from the Greater Phyllopod bed. A reflective area originally interpreted as external plates has been reinterpreted as a more complex structure inside the body; Derek Briggs, a leading authority on the arthropods of the Burgess Shale, has questioned its assignment as a barnacle or even an arthropod. The World Register of Marine Species places Priscansermarinus in Multicrustacea without assigning a class or order.

References

External links 
 

Barnacles
Prehistoric crustaceans
Burgess Shale animals
Fossil taxa described in 1981
Monotypic arthropod genera

Cambrian genus extinctions